Schwarzer Berg is a wooded hill located in the Main-Kinzig-Kreis of Hesse, Germany. It is part of the Mittelgebirge Spessart and lies between Bad Orb and Jossgrund.

Hills of Hesse
Main-Kinzig-Kreis
Hills of the Spessart